John Beswick may refer to:

 John Beswick, father of Hannah Beswick (1688–1758), the Manchester Mummy
 John Beswick (politician) (born 1937), former Australian politician and Deputy Premier of Tasmania
 John Ewart Beswick (1897–1978), English footballer

See also
 John Beswicke (1847–1925), Australian architect